Shane David Jett (born December 5, 1974) is an American politician from the state of Oklahoma, who is the State Senator from Senate District 17, which includes northern Pottawatomie County and eastern Oklahoma County.  He was a member of the Oklahoma House of Representatives from 2004 to 2010, representing House District 27. He also serves as chairman of the U.S. Treasury CDFI Fund Community Development Advisory Board.

Early life
Born in Shawnee, Oklahoma, Jett's father was an auto mechanic and Jett worked in his father's shop growing up in Tecumseh, Oklahoma. Jett graduated from Oklahoma Baptist University with a BBA majoring in international business and minoring in Spanish. Fluent in three languages, Jett spent two years in Belo Horizonte, Brazil, working for Global Options International.

Politics

Oklahoma House of Representatives 2004 to 2010
Jett first ran for a seat in the Oklahoma House of Representatives on November 5, 2002.  He was defeated by incumbent Democratic Representative Dale Smith; however, he held the incumbent to less than fifty percent of the vote and came about one percent away from upsetting the incumbent, 48.6% to 47.5%.

In 2004, Smith was term-limited after 14 years in the seat, leaving the seat open. Jett defeated Kevin Roland in the general election on November 2, 2004 and was elected to the Oklahoma House of Representatives, the first Republican to hold House district 27 in state history.  In 2006, Jett was re-elected to the seat with over 60% of the vote.

In 2008, Jett ran for re-election to House district 27 again and defeated Democrat Cole Koszara, a machinist, of Harrah, Oklahoma by 73% to 27%.  In April 2008, Jett was recommended as an officer to the United States Navy Reserve. Jett has since retired as a lieutenant.

In 2009, during his term a state representative, Jett proposed a bill to alter the flag of Oklahoma, which would have italicized and angled the word "Oklahoma" and adding an exclamation point after it.  Jett introduced the bill in front of the International Relations and Tourism Committee. Jett's motivation was to insert Oklahoma pride into the flag and potentially promote tourism.

In 2010, Jett decided not to run for re-election to the Oklahoma House, but ran instead for the 5th Congressional District seat in Oklahoma City metro area. He finished fourth, with 10.7% of the vote, in a seven candidate field. James Lankford won the Republican primary and was later elected to the job.

2014 5th Congressional District campaign
In 2014, Jett announced his candidacy for the Republican nomination for the 5th Congressional District of Oklahoma.  During a June 2014 campaign debate with the other four Republican candidates, Jett indicated that he would not have voted to raise the debt ceiling and would not have voted for John Boehner to remain as Speaker of the House.  Jett's biggest focus during his Congressional campaign was getting elected to reduce government spending, supporting a federal balanced budget amendment and a line-item veto.  Jett indicated that he is a supporter of Second Amendment gun rights. Jett indicated that he is anti-abortion and would support a human life amendment to the U.S. Constitution.  Jett finished fifth, with 12.3% of the vote, in a six candidate field.  Steve Russell won the Republican primaries and ended up holding the Congressional seat from 2015 to 2019.

2015 & 2017 At-large Tribal Councilor, Cherokee Nation, campaigns
In 2015, Jett ran for the at-large seat of the Council of the Cherokee Nation.  Jett finished third behind Wanda Hatfield and Betsy Swimmer.  Hatfield received 1,057 votes, Swimmer 770 votes, and Jett 717 votes.

After the 2016 Presidential campaign, Jett was appointed by President Donald Trump to the U.S. Treasury CDFI Fund Community Development Advisory Board where he serves as chairman.  The appointment was announced on September 15, 2017.

In 2017, Jett ran again for the At-large Tribal Councilor position of the Council of the Cherokee Nation.  Jett finished second in the field of seven candidates, losing to Mary Baker Shaw, with Shaw receiving 56.84% of the vote to Jett's 19.55%.

2020 Oklahoma State Senate District 17 campaign
Jett ran against incumbent State Senator for the 17th State Senate district of Oklahoma, Ron Sharp, a Republican from Shawnee.    Jett and Sharp were joined in the June 30, 2020 Republican primary by Brandon Baumgarten of Shawnee. Jett took first place in the June 30th election with 44% of the vote. Baumgarten was eliminated in the primary.  Jett faced Sharp, who came in second with 33% of the vote, in a runoff election on August 25, 2020.  Jett defeated Sharp in the runoff and received over 59% of the vote.

Jett faced Greg Sadler, a printing company employee from Newalla, Oklahoma, in the general election in November 2020. Sadler was the nominee of the Libertarian Party of Oklahoma. In the November 3, 2020 general election, Jett defeated Sadler with about 75% of the vote, to win the 17th Senate district seat.

In February 2021, Jett introduced a bill to the Oklahoma Senate to prohibit teaching of Critical race theory in Oklahoma schools.

Private life
Jett lives with his wife, Ana Carolina Jett née Gomes (originally of Brazil), in Shawnee, Oklahoma with their three daughters. Jett was the CEO of a tribal financial institution focused on economic growth.

House committees
2005-2010
 Chairman of the  Joint Committee on International Trade
 Co-chairman of the Joint Committee on International Development
2005-06
 Appropriation & Budget Subcommittee on General Government & Transportation, Vice Chair
 Energy & Utility Regulation Committee
 Transportation Committee
 Tourism & Recreation Committee
2007-08
 Rules Committee, Chair
 Appropriations & Budget Committee
 Telecommunications & Utility Regulation
 GCCA
 International, Federal & Tribal Relations
2009-10
 International Relations & Tourism Committee, Chair
 Energy & Utility Regulations Committee
 Appropriation & Budget Subcommittee on General Government & Transportation

Organizations
Legislative
 Native American Caucus of the Oklahoma Legislature, Founding Co-chair
 National Caucus of Native American State Legislators, Founding Member
 Governor's International Team
 Council of State Governments (CSG)
 National Conference of State Legislatures (NCSL)
 American Legislative Exchange Council (ALEC)
Others
 Gideons International
 McLoud, Shawnee, and Tecumseh Chambers of Commerce
 NAFSA: Association of International Educators - NAFSA: Association of International Educators
 Teachers of English to Speakers of Other Languages - TESOL
 Rotary International, Shawnee, OK
 American Council of Young Political Leaders

Election results

Oklahoma House of Representatives
2002

2004

2006

2008

U.S. Congress
2010

2014

Oklahoma State Senate
2020

References

External links
 
 Shane Jett on Twitter

1974 births
21st-century Native American politicians
Living people
Oklahoma Baptist University alumni
People from Shawnee, Oklahoma
Republican Party members of the Oklahoma House of Representatives
Republican Party Oklahoma state senators
Native American Christians
Native American military personnel
20th-century Native Americans
Cherokee Nation state legislators in Oklahoma
Cherokee Nation politicians
21st-century American politicians
Candidates in the 2010 United States elections
Candidates in the 2014 United States elections